String Along with Basie is an album by pianist, composer and bandleader Count Basie accompanied by a small band and string section on tracks recorded in 1959 and 1960 and originally released on the Roulette label.

Reception

AllMusic awarded the album 4½ stars.

Track listing
 "Summertime" (George Gershwin, DuBose Heyward) - 2:52
 "Song of the Islands" (Chas. E. King) - 4:14
 "Stringing the Blues" (Jimmy Jones) - 4:07
 "The One I Love" (Isham Jones, Gus Kahn) - 3:35
 "Blue and Sentimental" (Count Basie, Jerry Livingston, Mack David) - 3:34
 "Blues Bittersweet" (Quincy Jones) - 2:38
 "Poor Butterfly" (John Golden, Raymond Hubbell) - 4:15
 "These Foolish Things Remind Me of You" (Holt Marvell, Harry Link, Jack Strachey) - 4:32
 "She's Funny That Way (I Got A Woman Crazy For Me)" (Neil Moret, Richard Whiting) – 3:14
 "Sweet Lorraine" (Cliff Burwell, Mitchell Parish) - 3:15
Recorded in New York City on July 20, 1959 (tracks 5, 6 & 8) and May 10 & 11, 1960 (tracks 1-4, 7, 9 & 10)

Personnel 
Count Basie - piano
Freddie Green - guitar
George Duvivier - bass
Jimmy Crawford - drums
Unidentified string orchestra
Henry Coker, Al Grey, Benny Powell - trombone (tracks 5, 6 & 8)
Illinois Jacquet (tracks 1-4, 7, 9 & 10), Ben Webster (tracks 5, 6 & 8) - tenor saxophone
Herbie Mann, Frank Wess - flute (tracks 1-4, 7, 9 & 10)
Andy Fitzgerald - bass flute, bass clarinet (tracks 1-4, 7, 9 & 10)
Quincy Jones (tracks 5, 6 & 8), George Williams (tracks 1-4, 7, 9 & 10) - arrangers

References 

1960 albums
Count Basie albums
Roulette Records albums
Albums arranged by Quincy Jones
Albums arranged by George Williams (musician)
Albums produced by Teddy Reig